Refugio “Ref” Rodriguez (born 1972) is adjunct professor and a former member of the Los Angeles Unified School District Board of Education representing District 5 and former president of the Board. He resigned from both positions on July 23, 2018, after an accounting scandal.

Early life and career 
Rodriguez grew up in Cypress Park, Los Angeles and was the first out of five children of Mexican immigrants to graduate from college, earning a bachelor's degree from Loyola Marymount University and a PhD from Fielding Graduate University.

He returned to his home neighborhood after college to co-found Partnerships to Uplift Communities (PUC), a public charter school program, with Jacqueline Elliot. He also lectured at Loyola Marymount University and was appointed by Governor Jerry Brown to the California Commission on Teacher Credentialing in 2013.

Career

LAUSD Board of Education

District 5 election and tenure (2014–2018) 
In November 2014, Rodriguez announced that he would be running for a seat in the Board of Education and raised $50,000 during the first campaign reporting period. He ran against incumbent Bennett Kayser and Andrew Thomas, a professor at Walden University. He retained that he would do more for the District than pander to charter schools.

On July 7, 2017, Rodriguez was elected as the president of the Board of Education with a 4–3 vote. The four votes were newly elected members Kelly Gonez and Nick Melvoin, reelected member Mónica García, and Rodriguez himself.

Campaign contribution scandal (2017–2018) 
LA County District Attorney Jackie Lacey charged Rodriguez with three felony charges of conspiracy, perjury, and procuring and offering a false or forged instrument. The case was linked back to Rodriguez's bid for the board in 2014, with he and cousin Elizabeth Tinajero Melendrez reimbursing $25,000 to his campaign donors, most were family and friends. In January 2015, Rodriguez reported in his first campaign disclosure statement that more than $51,000 came from family, friends, and other people, but half actually came from himself. On September 20, 2017, the United Teachers Los Angeles called on the resignation of Rodriguez.

On September 19, 2017, Rodriguez stepped down as president amid charges of perjury and other felonies. Although stepping down, he remained on the board. On October 24, 2017, plead not guilty to the charges. On July 23, 2018, Rodriguez plead guilty to a felony count of conspiracy and four misdemeanor counts, and as part of a deal with prosecutors, resigned from office. Ten candidates ran to replace Rodriguez, and was replaced by Jackie Goldberg in 2019.

Controversies

Conflict of interest case 
On October 13, 2017, a conflict of interest complaint was filed against Rodriguez by a charter school network that he founded. A week later, on October 24, 2017, the California Fair Political Practices Commission closed the case against Rodriguez, citing his conspiracy charges filed by the Los Angeles District Attorney's Office.  The conflict of interest case did not have any relation to his felony case.

2018 arrest 
On March 16, 2018, Rodriguez was arrested at The Paseo at  around 4:30 p.m. for suspicion of public intoxication. He was released without being charged or cited, with Rodriguez thanking the officers for "being kind and seeing this for the non- event that it was.”

Elections

References 

1972 births
21st-century American politicians
School board members in California
Living people
Loyola Marymount University alumni
Fielding Graduate University alumni
California politicians convicted of crimes
Politicians from Los Angeles
California Democrats